The 2017 Rally de Portugal was the sixth round of the 2017 World Rally Championship and the 51st running of the Rally de Portugal.

Sébastien Ogier and Julien Ingrassia were the rally winners. Their team, M-Sport Ford WRT, were the manufacturers' winners.

Entry list

Classification

Event standings

Special stages

Power Stage
The Power Stage was a  stage at the end of the rally.

Championship standings after the rally

Drivers' Championship standings

Manufacturers' Championship standings

References

External links
 The official website of the World Rally Championship

2017 World Rally Championship season
2017
2017 in Portuguese motorsport
May 2017 sports events in Europe